Ypsolopha sequella is a moth of the family Ypsolophidae. It is found in Europe and Anatolia.

The wingspan is 18–20 mm. The moth flies from July to September depending on the location.

The larvae feed on willow, maple and Tilia.

Due to its conspicuous black wing markings, resembling a rabbit, the German colloquial name of this moth translates as 'Easter Bunny Moth'.

References

External links
Ypsolopha sequella at UKmoths
 waarneming.nl 
 Lepidoptera of Belgium

Ypsolophidae
Moths described in 1759
Moths of Europe
Moths of Asia
Taxa named by Carl Alexander Clerck